The 1904 All-Ireland Senior Hurling Championship Final was the 17th All-Ireland Final and the culmination of the 1904 All-Ireland Senior Hurling Championship, an inter-county hurling tournament for the top teams in Ireland. The match was held on Maurice Davin's land in Carrick-on-Suir on 24 June 1906 between Cork and Kilkenny. Kilkenny won by a single point.

Kilkenny led by 1-5 to 0-5 at half time.

Match details

References
 Corry, Eoghan, The GAA Book of Lists (Hodder Headline Ireland, 2005).
 Donegan, Des, The Complete Handbook of Gaelic Games (DBA Publications Limited, 2005).

1
All-Ireland Senior Hurling Championship Finals
Cork county hurling team matches
Kilkenny GAA matches